The Division of North Sydney is an Australian electoral division in the state of New South Wales.

History

It was proclaimed in 1900 and was one of the original 75 divisions contested at the first federal election. It originally stretched as far as the Northern Beaches, though much of that area became Warringah in 1922.

Second only to the nearby Division of Wentworth, the Division of North Sydney has the nation's second-highest proportion (56.4%) of high-income families. As with all North Shore seats, it has usually been a comfortably safe seat for the Liberal Party of Australia and its predecessors. Labor has usually run dead in the seat, though it came within 3.1 percent of winning it in the 1943 election landslide. North Sydney and Wentworth are the only two federation divisions in New South Wales to have never been held by Labor. The Liberal hold on the seat was broken in 1990 by "father of the independents" Ted Mack, who had represented much of the area in state parliament from 1981 to 1988. He held the seat for two terms before retiring at the 1996 election, after two terms, for the same reason he previously chose to resign from state parliament after two terms − to avoid receiving a parliamentary pension.

However, during Mack's tenure, North Sydney was always a safe Liberal seat in traditional two-party-preferred match-ups, and it was a foregone conclusion that it would revert to the Liberals once Mack retired. Indeed, when Mack retired in 1996, Joe Hockey reclaimed the seat for the Liberals on a swing large enough to revert the seat to its traditional status as a comfortably safe Liberal seat. Hockey held it easily until 2015, serving as Treasurer from 2013 to 2015 in the Abbott Government. After Abbott was ousted as Liberal leader and Prime Minister by Malcolm Turnbull in the September 2015 Liberal leadership spill Hockey moved to the backbench, but six days later he announced his intention to resign from parliament, taking effect from 23 October. The 2015 North Sydney by-election was held on 5 December to elect his replacement.

Trent Zimmerman, a former Hockey staffer, retained the seat for the Liberal Party with 48.2 percent of the primary vote after a larger-than-predicted 12.8 percent swing against the Turnbull Coalition Government. That was only the second time in North Sydney since federation that the successful Liberal candidate had not obtained a majority of the primary vote and had to rely on preferences. Zimmerman faced a double-digit primary vote swing − more than triple that of the 2015 Canning by-election − even though Labor did not even contest the seat.

The Liberal two-candidate-preferred vote of 60.2 percent against independent Stephen Ruff compares to the previous election vote of 65.9 percent against Labor. The reduction of 5.7 percent could not be considered a "two-party/candidate preferred swing" − when a major party is absent, preference flows to both major parties does not take place, resulting in asymmetric preference flows.

Zimmerman became the first openly LGBTI member of the House of Representatives. He won the seat in his own right in 2016 and 2019. However, in 2022, he lost over 13 percent of his primary vote and was defeated by teal independent Kylea Tink, the second non-Liberal ever to win it.

The most notable member for the seat was Billy Hughes, Prime Minister of Australia from 1915 to 1923, and later a minister in the Lyons, Page, Menzies and Fadden governments. Hughes is the longest-serving parliamentarian in Australian history. He transferred to Bradfield after it was carved out of North Sydney's northern portion in 1949, and died as that seat's member in 1952. Other notable members include Mack, Hockey, and Dugald Thomson, a minister in the Reid Government.

Boundaries
Since 1984, federal electoral division boundaries in Australia have been determined at redistributions by a redistribution committee appointed by the Australian Electoral Commission. Redistributions occur for the boundaries of divisions in a particular state, and they occur every seven years, or sooner if a state's representation entitlement changes or when divisions of a state are malapportioned.

Located along Sydney's Lower North Shore, the division is named after the suburb of North Sydney. It also includes the suburbs of Artarmon, Cammeray, Castlecrag, Crows Nest, Greenwich, Henley, Hunters Hill, Huntleys Cove, Huntleys Point, Kirribilli, Lane Cove, Lane Cove North, Lane Cove West, Lavender Bay, Linley Point, Longueville, McMahons Point, Middle Cove, Milsons Point, Naremburn, North Willoughby, Northbridge, Northwood, Riverview, St Leonards, Waverton, Willoughby, Willoughby East, Wollstonecraft, and Woolwich; as well as parts of Chatswood, Chatswood West, Cremorne, Gladesville, Gore Hill, and Neutral Bay.

Members

Election results

References

External links
 Division of North Sydney - Australian Electoral Commission

Electoral divisions of Australia
Constituencies established in 1901
1901 establishments in Australia